Begonia socotrana is a species of plant in the family Begoniaceae. It is endemic to Yemen.  Its natural habitats are subtropical or tropical dry forests, subtropical or tropical dry shrubland, and rocky areas.

References

socotrana
Endemic flora of Socotra
Least concern plants
Taxonomy articles created by Polbot
Plants described in 1881
Taxa named by Joseph Dalton Hooker